John Michael Roche (born September 26, 1949) is a retired American professional basketball player in both the American Basketball Association (ABA) and the National Basketball Association (NBA). The 6'3" (1.90 m), 170 lb (77 kg) guard's career spanned from 1971 to 1982.

Roche attended high school at La Salle Academy and received his B.S. degree in business administration from the  University of South Carolina in 1971. While at the University of South Carolina, he was twice named the ACC basketball Player of the Year and was second in the voting in his other varsity year. He was a consensus All-American and Academic All-American basketball player in 1970 and 1971. He was named the 20th best player in the history of the Atlantic Coast Conference on its 50-year anniversary team.

After graduation, he was selected by the Phoenix Suns in the first round (14th pick) of the 1971 NBA draft and also selected by the Kentucky Colonels in the 1971 ABA Draft. Roche signed with the New York Nets of the ABA, who had obtained the rights to him from the Colonels. He was selected to the 1972 ABA All-Rookie team, and played with the Nets during his first three seasons. During the 1973–74 season, he was traded back to Colonels for Mike Gale and Wendell Ladner. Roche is the first in NBA history to hit 7 three-point field goals in a single quarter. He played professional basketball for nine years, including three years for the Denver Nuggets. During the time he played professional basketball, he received his J.D. (1981) from the University of Denver College of Law. He is the only person who played in the NBA as a licensed lawyer.

Roche is currently an attorney at the Denver office of the law firm Taylor|Anderson. He practiced at Davis, Graham and Stubbs for eighteen years and Snell & Wilmer for nine years before joining Taylor|Anderson in 2009. He is admitted to practice in the State of Colorado, the United States District Court for the District of Colorado and the United States Court of Appeals for the Tenth Circuit, and he is a member of the Colorado and Denver Bar Associations.   Roche has also taught Remedies as an adjunct professor at the University of Denver Sturm College of Law.

Roche is a member of the New York City, LaSalle Academy, University of South Carolina and the State of South Carolina Halls of Fame. He is a nine time singles champion of the Denver City Open tennis tournament in his various age groups and a recipient of the Sam & Sid Milstein Award as "outstanding senior male tennis player" for the year 2014 in the Intermountain Colorado region. Roche is also an avid yoga practitioner.

External links
ABA/NBA stats @ basketball-reference.com
College & ABA/NBA stats @ basketballreference.com
 @ Taylor | Anderson
SC Athletic History as gamecocksonline.cstv.com

1949 births
Living people
All-American college men's basketball players
American men's basketball players
Basketball players from New York City
Colorado lawyers
Denver Nuggets players
American environmental lawyers
Kentucky Colonels draft picks
Kentucky Colonels players
Los Angeles Lakers players
New York Nets players
Phoenix Suns draft picks
Point guards
South Carolina Gamecocks men's basketball players
Sturm College of Law alumni
Utah Stars players